All My Babies: A Midwife's Own Story is a 1953 educational film written, directed and produced by George C. Stoney which was used to educate midwives in the Southern United States and promote greater cooperation between midwifery and the modern health system. It was produced by the Georgia Department of Public Health. The film follows Mary Francis Hill Coley (1900–66) an African American midwife from Albany, Georgia who helped deliver over 3,000 babies in the middle part of the 20th century. On December 17, 2002, it was announced by Librarian of Congress James H. Billington that "All My Babies, George Stoney's landmark educational film used to educate midwives in Georgia and throughout the South" was among the annual selection of 25 motion pictures to be added to the National Film Registry.

Plot 
The film was produced as a method of educating "granny midwives," the term applied to African-American lay women who delivered the majority of both black and white women's babies in the rural south, and their patients. The film stresses the need for midwives to maintain scrupulous standards of sterility. This lecture comes from a doctor who is explaining the cause of a recent infant death. The second message concerns the necessity of prenatal care and here Coley, or "Miss Mary" as she's referred to in the film, functions as the expert. The film follows her through two births, the first of which focuses on a woman who has had several successful deliveries, while the other woman has had two miscarriages due to lack of prenatal care. Under Coley's careful guidance and tutelage, both women achieve successful pregnancies and home births. Films such as All My Babies represent part of the transition to State legal oversights and eventual elimination of lay midwifery (also called direct-entry midwifery) in many States.

Production 

All My Babies was written produced and directed by documentary filmmaker, George C. Stoney, and is one of his earliest and most widely recognized. Stoney was interested in the subject as a child watching the midwives go about their work in odd hours and later as a Southern field representative who gave midwives lifts and learning more about their work. He first worked with the Georgia Department of Public Health writing and directing Palmour Street, a documentary about mental health in black families. Due to its success the Georgia Department of Public Health determined he was qualified to direct a film on midwives and was initially granted $20,000. The final production cost was $45,000 and filming took place between August 1951 and fall 1952.

Stoney partnered local African American Dr. William Mason to gain the trust of the black community while Stoney, with backing from the health department, worked on gaining trust from the white community. To gain their trust, Stoney assured the white community that the film would not suggest an unhappy relationship between blacks and whites existed and worked with the local press to publish favorable articles. Stoney also gained the support of progressive black pastor, Bishop Noah, who preached to the Church of the Kingdom of God, and where Mary Coley attended, not to be afraid of white people. Coley and the congregation therefore welcomed both blacks and whites, including the all-white film crew, and weren't overly suspicious due to Bishop Noah's direction. While the white film crew and cast had a good working relationship, the film's production wasn't devoid of segregation or bias (racial and north–south) between the white community and cast and the crew and black cast. The southern medical establishment was also uneasy with the film's glorification of the midwife's role in the community.

Prior to filming, Stoney followed Coley at her appointments to do field research having learnt from Palmour Street that it is important to meet the black community where it was at to create an authentic film and not solely rely on information from experts and books. Coley advised on the film as well, helping to  plan and structure the film's scenes so they were more realistic to her work. While some scenes were scripted, the film is notable for featuring a 15-minute real-time sequence of a live birth, a technique pioneered by filmmakers Pare Lorentz and Robert Flaherty. The live birth scene is silent with narratives of the doctors, Coley, and the chorus creating the joyous music with the babies cries upon birth being the emphasis. The score, written by Louis Applebaum and performed by the Musical Art Chorus in Washington, D.C., gives the film a sense of joy during childbirth. Coley also sings throughout the film as she cares for  mothers.

Reception 
The film met some criticism with the public due to the graphic nature of the birth scene, but was still shown to avant-garde audiences in New York at Cinema 16 and the inaugural Flaherty Film Seminar in 1953. It met all the requirements of the Health Department for safe birthing and was officially sanctioned for medical audiences due to the birth scene. This meant it could only be shown at private screenings, which included the New York locations, where it would not be fined or censored. Stoney also encouraged the restriction desiring to protect the film's subjects and legitimatize the film as a teaching tool. The film was distributed by UNESCO, the World Health Organization, UNICEF, to various other countries, and become widely used in medical school curriculum. The film was also used to promote respect of midwives by doctors and the medical establishment, particularly in countries where the film was demonstrated the United States' medical establishment wasn't afraid to work with midwives. However, the Georgia Department of Public Health provided an accompanying pamphlet with the film stating that the medical profession was not endorsing midwives, seeing them as a "temporary and unfortunate necessity."

Preservation 
In 2002, the film was selected for preservation in the United States National Film Registry by the Library of Congress as being "culturally, historically, or aesthetically significant". The film is the subject of a short 2006 article by Christine Dell'Amore. Photographic stills by Robert Galbraith from the film formed the basis of an exhibition curated by Linda Janet Holmes called "Reclaiming Midwives: Stills from All My Babies," on display at the Smithsonian Institution's National Museum of African American History and Culture.

References

External links
All My Babies: A Midwife's Own Story essay by Joshua Glick at National Film Registry 
All My Babies: A Midwife's Own Story essay by Daniel Eagan in America's Film Legacy: The Authoritative Guide to the Landmark Movies in the National Film Registry, A&C Black, 2010 , pages 464-465 

 

1953 films
United States National Film Registry films
Works about midwifery
Documentary films about pregnancy
1953 documentary films
American documentary films
Films shot in Georgia (U.S. state)
1950s pregnancy films
American black-and-white films
American pregnancy films
1950s English-language films
1950s American films